The 1990 Illinois gubernatorial election was held on November 6, 1990. Incumbent Governor James R. Thompson chose to retire instead seeking reelection to a fifth term. Republican candidate Jim Edgar won his first of two terms in office, defeating Democrat Neil Hartigan by a narrow margin of about 80,000 votes.

Election information
The primaries and general elections coincided with those for federal elections (Senate and House), as well as those for other state offices. The election was part of the 1990 Illinois elections.

Turnout
For the primaries,  turnout for the gubernatorial primaries was 26.11%, with 1,570,596 votes cast and turnout for the lieutenant gubernatorial primaries was 21.67% with 1,303,250 votes cast. For the general election, turnout was 54.00%, with 3,257,410 votes cast.

Democratic primary 
Illinois Attorney General Neil Hartigan won the Democratic gubernatorial nomination, running unopposed.

Governor

Lieutenant Governor 
James B. Burns, future attorney for the Northern District of Illinois, won the Democratic nomination, running unopposed.

Republican primary

Governor 
Illinois Secretary of State Jim Edgar defeated investor and political activist Steve Baer, as well as perennial candidate Robert Marshall.

Lieutenant Governor
Illinois State Senator Bob Kustra won the Republican primary for lieutenant governor.

Solidarity primary 
Only 13 votes were cast in the primary, all write in votes for Jeff W. Smith. The party, nevertheless, ultimately nominated Jessie Fields.

Governor

General election

References

1990
Gubernatorial
Illinois